Van Raaphorst is a surname. Notable people with the surname include:

Dick Van Raaphorst (1942–2020), American football player
Jeff Van Raaphorst (born 1963), American football player
Mike Van Raaphorst (born 1978), American football player

Surnames of Dutch origin